Fisherton is a coastal hamlet near Inverness, Scotland.

Fisherton may also refer to:
Fisherton Anger, Wiltshire, England, now part of Salisbury
Fisherton Delamere, Wiltshire, England
Barrio Fisherton, a neighborhood in Rosario, Santa Fe province, Argentina

See also 
 Fisherton Station (disambiguation)
 
 Fishertown, Pennsylvania
 Fiskerton (disambiguation)